The  Virginia W  is a Chesapeake Bay skipjack, built in 1904 at Guilford, Virginia. She is a  two-sail bateau, or "V"-bottomed deadrise type of centerboard sloop. She is one of the 35 surviving traditional Chesapeake Bay skipjacks and a member of the last commercial sailing fleet in the United States. She is located at Cambridge, Maryland, Dorchester County.

She was listed on the National Register of Historic Places in 1985. She is assigned Maryland dredge number 12.

References

External links
, including photo in 1984, at Maryland Historical Trust

Ships in Talbot County, Maryland
Skipjacks
Ships on the National Register of Historic Places in Maryland
1904 ships
National Register of Historic Places in Talbot County, Maryland